Glory Bound may refer to:

Glory Bound, album by The Wailin' Jennys
Glory Bound, album by The Grahams
"Glory Bound", single by The Grass Roots from Move Along 1972
"Glory Bound", song by Martin Sexton